Noteworthy events of Guantánamo Bay.

Timeline
 30 April 1494 – Christopher Columbus, on his second voyage of exploration, sailed into Guantánamo Bay and remained overnight. He called the bay Puerto Grande.
 18 July 1741 – Vice Admiral Edward Vernon, with 3,000 British troops under General Wentworth, arrived at Guantánamo Bay to begin an unsuccessful campaign to capture Santiago.
 December 1760 – Boats from the frigates  and  cut-out the French privateers Vainquer and Mackau hiding in the bay. The French were also forced to burn another, the Guespe, to prevent her capture.
 10 June 1898 – A battalion of Marines landed at Fisherman's Point and made camp on McCalla Hill, the first U.S. troops ashore in Cuba in the Spanish–American War.
 23 February 1903 – President Theodore Roosevelt signed original lease agreement with Cuba for a naval base at Guantánamo Bay. See Platt Amendment.
 3 March 1903 – U.S. Congress appropriated $100,000 for "necessary expenditures incident to the occupation and utilization of the naval station at Guantánamo, Cuba ..."
 10 December 1903 – Cuba turned over the Naval Reservation to the United States.
 27 April 1904 – An appropriation of $385,500 was made for an emergency repair installation at Guantánamo Bay, including a dry dock to be built on South Toro Cay.
 1906 (exact date unknown) – Work on dry dock on South Toro Cay was discontinued.
 29 September 1906 – Roosevelt sent U.S. troops to Cuba to crush a revolt, thus bringing about the second U.S. occupation of Cuba, which lasted until 1909.
 1908 (Spring) – Station ship  burned.
 10 March 1913 – LT John H. Towers (later Admiral and Chief of Bureau of Aeronautics) flew from Guantánamo Bay to Santiago in a Curtiss flying boat in 46 minutes.
 10 December 1913 – The Naval Station was officially opened at its present location, the main activities having been moved from South Toro Cay.
 1924 (Winter) – First concentration of Atlantic and Pacific Fleets in Caribbean.
 7 August 1928 – Naval Station damaged by hurricane, whose center passed 50 miles to the south.
 1938 (late in year) – Hepburn Board visited Station and made recommendations for expansion.
 1 July 1939 – Station started receiving water from pumping station at Yateras River via new pipeline.
 12 July 1940 – Contract signed with Frederick Snare Corporation to begin a vast construction program for build-up of the Station.
 1 April 1941 – Naval Operating Base, Guantánamo Bay, Cuba, established.
 25 February 1948 – President Harry S. Truman visited Base.
 18 June 1952 – Title of Naval Operating Base changed to Naval Base.
 8 June 1993 – US detention of HIV-positive refugees at Guantánamo Bay declared unconstitutional.

In addition to two presidents, many other distinguished people have visited the Naval Base. At one time General John J. Pershing was a visitor on board . Charles A. Lindbergh was a visitor during his goodwill flight around the Americas in the "Spirit of St. Louis". Before and during the World War II years, visitors included members of Congress, Cabinet officers, ambassadors, Harry Hopkins, Eleanor Roosevelt, and others.

Other important visitors the base have included:
 U.S. Ambassador Robert Butler (from Havana), 21–22 December 1950
 Admiral and Mrs. Forrest P. Sherman, 31 December 1950 – 1 January 1951
 Vice Admiral R. V. Symonds-Tayler, RN, 8–15 January 1951
 Carlos Hevia, former President of Cuba and Cuban Minister without portfolio (graduate of U. S. Naval Academy, class of 1920) 19 October 1951
 U.S. Ambassador and Mrs. Howard Travers (from Haiti), 4 December 1951 on two occasions subsequently
 Peruvian Minister of Marine Roque A. Saldias, 20–22 May 1952
 Cuban Minister of National Defense Nicolas Perez Hernandez 17 June 1952
 U.S. Ambassador and Mrs. Willard L. Beaulac (from Havana) 19–20 June 1952
 The Chief of Naval Operations, Admiral W. M. Fechteler, 18 December 1952.

Landmarks

 Hospital Cay – So named when a British man-of-war used it for isolation and treatment of yellow fever victims in 1854 (although legend has name dating back to Admiral Vernon in 1741).
 Deer Point – Named for deer which were once numerous on the Base, and still exist in small numbers.
 Evans Point – Named for Rear Admiral Robley Dunglison Evans, who started the fleet on its cruise around the world in 1908.
 Radio Point – Marked by soaring towers of radio transmitters.
 Paola Point – Named about 1916 for Paola Copeland, daughter of LT David Copeland, CEC, who was stationed here.
 Stephen Crane Hill – Named for author of The Red Badge of Courage, and other stories, who covered the 1898 fighting at Guantánamo Bay as a newspaper correspondent.
Crest of hill is marked by an old French cannon, with a bronze tablet commemorative of Marine and Naval personnel killed in the fighting: Marines Dumphy, Good, Smith, McColgan, Taurman, and Acting Assistant Surgeon Gibbs, USN.
 CPO Club – Built in 1916 as Enlisted Men's Recreation Building, huge frame structure overlooks Fleet Landing and much of the Base.
 Old Officer's Club – Built about 1912 at end of Evans Point, now Quarters 610.
 Quarters "X" – Built on Evans Point as quarters for Rifle Range Officer in 1906, now a 4-unit apartment house.
 North Toro Cemetery – Established 1906, last bodies removed 1944, and cemetery abandoned.
 Drydock on South Toro Cay – Started in 1904, discontinued in 1906, contours still visible.
 Million-gallon Reservoir – Uncompleted concrete reservoir, most of it below the surface of the ground, at the top of Commandant's Hill, North Toro Cay.
 All-America Cable Station – Only private enterprise on the Naval Base, buildings stand on cliffs above Fisherman's Point.
 Fort McCalla – South of Cable Station, built by Army in 1906.
 Fort Conde – On Conde Bluff, west of Hicacal Beach, built by Army in 1907.
 Marine Monument – Marks spot, near Naval Air Station, pistol range, where two Marines, Privates Dumphy and McColgan, were killed on 11 June 1898 by Spanish forces.
 Phillips Park – Race track, where horses once trotted, now a recreation area with ball field, stands, picnic shelters, tables, and benches. Named for RADM W. K. Phillips, a former Base Commander.
 Paul Jones Hill – Highest hill on the Base, 494 feet, once had a "Mountain House" on the top for recreation use of officers and families.
 Light House – Located near tip of Windward Point, marks starting point of metes and bounds description of area comprising the Base. Light no longer in use.

Beaches
 Kittery Beach – Near northeast boundary of Base, named for the supply ship which for many years brought provisions to the Station.
 Windmill Beach – Recently developed as principal recreation for Base residents. Derivation of name is unknown since no record has been found of any windmill ever having been located there.
 Hidden Beach
 Cable Beach
 Hicacal Beach
 Girl Scout Beach
 Glass Beach – Previously used as a dump site. Glass fragments can still be found on the beach.

Roads
Most of the roads on the Base have functional or numerical names which require no explanation (e.g., Deer Point Road, Kittery Beach Road, First Street). Other roads include:

 Sherman Avenue – The only avenue on the Base, named for Admiral Forrest P. Sherman, U.S. Navy, Chief of Naval Operations, 1949–51.

Several roads in the Industrial area named for Cuban national or local heroes:
 Céspedes – First Revolutionary President of short-lived Republic in 1868.
 Martí – Spiritual leader of the Cuban independence movement.
 Gómez – Commander-in-Chief of Cuban Armed Forces in the War of Liberation.
 Maceo (Antonio) – Noted field general.
 García – Field general Calixto García.
 Pérez – Field general.
 Enrique Thomas – Colonel who assisted Marines in driving Spanish from area.
 Emilio Giró – Colonel and first Mayor of Guantánamo City under the Republic.

Some roads at the Naval Air Station are named for noted admirals who were naval aviators: 
 Mitscher
 McCain
 Moffett

The following Naval Air Station roads are named for men who lost their lives in the fighting here in June 1898: Good, Taurman, Smith, Dumphy, McColgan, and Gibbs. Also roads are named for McCalla and Huntington, who were Navy and Marine commanders, respectively, in the U. S. capture of Guantánamo Bay.

 Moss Road and Thorne Road are named for former commanding officers of the Naval Air Station.
 Rowan Road – Named for LT Rowan, USA, immortalized by Elbert Hubbard in his "A Message to Garcia".
 Potter Road – Named for David Potter, former Paymaster General.
 Welles Road – Named for Gideon Welles, third Paymaster General and later Secretary of the Navy.
 Soule, Johnson, Rogers, Ackerman and Tozer Roads are named for former Commandants of the Naval Station.
 Marshall Road, Peddicord Road and Rickman Circle are named for victims of fire at Wharf Tare on 9 June 1951.
 Diamond Road – Named for a famous Marine sergeant major.
 The following roads in the Naval Hospital area are named for Navy medical officers: Gendreau, Melhorn, Gearing, Crossland, and Stuart.
 Ladislao Guerra Road – Named for the late Mayor of Guantánamo, Dr. Ladislao L. Guerra Sanchez, a friend of the Base, who died 7 December 1952.

1953–1964 Period

 Cooper Field – Baseball field at the Fleet Recreation Center named for former Naval Base Commandet Rear Admiral W. G. Cooper September 1955 to October 1956. Dedication date unknown.
 W. T. Sampson School – Dedicated on 25 October 1956. Named after Admiral William T. Sampson, USN, Spanish–American War naval hero who headed the U. S. Fleet which operated in the water surrounding Cuba.
 Morin Center – Dedicated 27 September 1961. Named after William H. Morin, Boatswains Mate Second Class, U. S. Navy, a Medal of Honor recipient. Received the Medal of Honor while serving aboard USS Marblehead on 27 July 1898, disabled 27 contact mines in Guantánamo Bay. Built as a community center with restaurant facilities.
 Marblehead Hall – Dedicated in September 1962. Named after USS Marblehead which participated in the various battles at Guantánamo Bay during the Spanish–American War 1898. Houses 16 bowling lanes, snack bar, gymnasium, lockers. Located near Cooper Field.
 Denich Hill – Dedicated on 26 June 1963. Named for George J. Denich, Jr., EON3, USNR who was killed while driving a bulldozer in the construction of base fortifications on 10 April 1963. A monument is located at the foot of the hill located in the southeastern section of the base. Dedication ceremonies were attended by the Denich family.
 Bulkeley Hill – Land area overlooking the Northeast Gate. Named after Rear Admiral John D. Bulkeley, Commander, Naval Base, Guantánamo Bay, Cuba, during the water crisis in February 1964, who stood watch on this hill in battle greens, wearing his "Big Iron", a .357 Colt magnum pistol, 12 to 18 hours a day, for several weeks. Marines who served with the Admiral named the hill in his honor.

See also

 Cuba–United States relations
 History of Cuba
 Timeline of Cuban history

Guantanamo Bay Naval Base
History of Cuba
Guantanamo Bay
Cuba–United States relations